is a Japanese light novel series written by Doufu Mayoi. It began publication online on the Shōsetsuka ni Narō novel posting website in October 2014. Overlap began publishing the series with illustrations by Kurogin under their Overlap Bunko imprint in June 2016. A manga adaptation with illustrations by Gin Ammo began serialization in Overlap's Comic Gardo website in January 2018. An anime television series adaptation by Satelight aired from July to September 2022.

Plot
Waking up in a strange new place with no memory of his past life, Kelvin learns that he's bartered away those very memories in exchange for powerful new abilities during his recent transmigration. Heading out into a whole new world as a Summoner—with his first Follower being the very goddess who brought him over! Kelvin begins his new life as an adventurer, and it isn't long before he discovers his hidden disposition as a battle junkie. From the Black Knight of the Ancient Castle of Evil Spirits to the demon within the Hidden Cave of the Sage, he revels in the fight against one formidable foe after another.

Characters

The main protagonist who is a reincarnated Summoner, the only S-rank summoner in the world. He bartered away his memories of his previous life to gain useful abilities; though only memory of himself, akin to amnesia. His current contracted servants are Clotho, Gerard, Melfina, and Sera. 

Kelvin is in romantic relationships with Mel, Efil, Seras and Ange; being a natural chick magnet.

Originally a slave, she is a Half-Elf, bought by Kelvin and trained to be a formidable Archer. She had a curse to set anybody she touches on fire, until Kelvin came and broke it. She is domineering whenever a pretty woman hits on Kelvin.

The Goddess of Reincarnation, she is the one responsible for giving Kelvin his powers in exchange for his memories. As she is a godess, she has a very high level, over 100. She is so strong that Kevin himself, an S-rank summoner, couldn't summon her when he entered the world. Her true form was hidden, appearing as an interactive game menu until creating an artificial body for herself which Kevlin can summon. In her artificial body, she is shown to look like an angel, with wings and a white dress. 
She's a glutton, who even sleep talks about food.

Clotho is a contracted Slime used by Kelvin. He is the first monster contracted by Kelvin, and is immediately put to use by him to kill another slime. He has since evolved into a Slime Gluttonia, a monster almost as strong as Demon Lords.

He is a Blackghost Knight, bound to earth by the pain and anger of losing his wife and kids. He is Kelvin's second contracted monster. As of episode 5, he has evolved into an Abyssal Knight Commander. He sees and addresses Kelvin as "[his] King". But they work together as equals during quests.

She is the daughter of the former Demon King Gustav, who was sealed away for her safety. She was taught to become an Arcane Pugilist and became Kelvin's third contracted servant. Despite her age, Sera is like a big child; since the world is all so new to her.

Receptionist of the Adventurer's Guild in Parth. She is secretly an assassin meant to keep an eye on Kelvin as oversight from the Reincarnation process; though she ends up in love with him as well.

A reincarnated Hero summoned by Kelvin, who he adopts as his sister; having previously died young from illness. Kelvin is secretly grooming her as a Hero, but has Rion to enjoy her life as she wishes. Rion loves fantasy stories, which is why she adapts to the new world easy.

Media

Light novels
Written by Doufu Mayoi, the series began publication online on Shōsetsuka ni Narō on October 6, 2014. The series was later acquired by Overlap, who began publishing the series with illustrations by Kurogin (and DaiXt as of volume 7) under their Overlap Bunko imprint on June 25, 2016. As of June 2022, seventeen volumes have been released. In July 2020, J-Novel Club announced they licensed the series for English publication.

Volume list

Manga
A manga adaptation, illustrated by Gin Ammo, began serialization in Comic Gardo on January 11, 2018. As of January 2023, the individual chapters have been collected into fifteen tankōbon volumes. J-Novel Club is also publishing the manga in English.

Volume list

Anime
An anime television series adaptation was announced on February 17, 2022. It is produced by Satelight and directed and scripted by Yoshimasa Hiraike, with Miwa Oshima designing the characters and Michiru and Yuria Miyazono composing the music. It aired from July 9 to September 24, 2022, on Tokyo MX. Crunchyroll has licensed the series, and has also began streaming an English dub starting on July 23, 2022. Medialink has licensed the series in Asian region and streaming on their Youtube channel Ani-One Asia.

Episode list

Reception
As of May 2021, the series has over one million copies in circulation.

Notes

References

External links
  at Shōsetsuka ni Narō 
  
  
  
 

2016 Japanese novels
2022 anime television series debuts
Anime and manga based on light novels
Fiction about reincarnation
Crunchyroll anime
Fantasy anime and manga
Isekai anime and manga
Isekai novels and light novels
Japanese fantasy novels
J-Novel Club books
Japanese webcomics
Light novels
Light novels first published online
Overlap Bunko
Satelight
Shōnen manga
Shōsetsuka ni Narō
Webcomics in print